The Congressional Caucus on Black Women and Girls is a United States congressional caucus founded on March 29, 2016 to advance issues and legislation important to the welfare of women and girls of African descent.

Founding

In response to the tragedy of Sandra Bland, the caucus was inspired and created by the #SheWoke Committee: Ifeoma Ike, Esq., Nakisha Lewis, Sharon Copper (sister of Sandra Bland), Tiffany Hightower, Shambulia Gadsden Sams, Sharisse "She-Salt" Stancil-Ashford, and Avis Jones-DeWeever, Ph.D. – seven leading black women activists who consistently advocate for the global equity of black women and girls.

See also
 Congressional Black Caucus
 Congressional Caucus for Women's Issues

References

External links
 Announcement

Caucuses of the United States Congress
Organizations established in 2016
Women's organizations based in the United States
African-American women's organizations
African-American members of the United States Congress
African-American gender relations